Carlos Augusto de Mascarenhas Relvas de Campos  (13 November 1838 – 23 January 1894), more commonly known simply as Carlos Relvas, was a wealthy Portuguese landowner, and sportsman. He is perhaps best known as a talented amateur bullfighter, and as a pioneer of photography in Portugal.

Biography
Carlos Relvas was born in the Outeiro Palace, in Golegã, a small village in the rural province of Ribatejo in Portugal. His father, José Farinha Relvas de Campos was one of the wealthiest landowners in Ribatejo. He was educated by private tutors in science and foreign languages, namely French.

Carlos Relvas inherited a veritable fortune and extensive land from his parents, but was always held in high regard for his charitability.

Of an artistic disposition, he soon turned to photography. In 1876, he had an opulent atelier built in one of his properties in Golegã, and bought several of the most modern photographic apparatuses from all over Europe. His photographic works became very well known and highly valued in Portugal: it did not take long until Carlos Relvas was considered the finest amateur photographer in the country. He became a member of the Société française de photographie, and many of his photographs were showcased in several exhibitions, both national and abroad, and won many prizes:

 Progress Medal (Vienna, 1873)
 Silver Medal (Madrid, 1873)
 Silver Medal (Vienna Photographic Society, 1875)
 Medal (Philadelphia, 1876)
 First Prize (Amsterdam, 1876)
 Gold Medal (Horticultural Exhibition at the Crystal Palace of Oporto, 1877)
 Gold Medal (Exhibition of the Union centrale des Arts décoratifs, Palais de l'Industrie, Paris)

He also became a notable sportsman, a perfect gentleman-rider: a habile marksman, fencer, and horse rider. He also became a famous amateur bullfighter, both as a cavaleiro (on horseback) and as a bandarilheiro. An enthusiast of the sport, he had a bullring built in Golegã, and frequently took part in bullfighting spectacles for charity: profits from the opening performance of the Golegã arena reverted to the local hospital, and his last performance, in 1893, was to aid the victims of the 1893 Azores hurricane.

In 1853, at age 15, Carlos Relvas married D. Margarida Amália Mendes de Vasconcelos, the daughter of the Counts of Podentes, one of the most illustrious families in Beira Alta, and the couple had four children — most notably José Relvas, a republican politician who actively participated in the 5 October 1910 revolution, and who briefly served as the country's Prime Minister in 1919.

His wife died in 1887 and, one year later, he married Mariana Correia, a marriage that was not accepted by the entirety of his family. The couple moved to Carlos Relvas's photographic studio, now repurposed as a house, where they lived until Relvas's death on 23 January 1894, after contracting sepsis following a horse-riding accident.

References

1838 births
1894 deaths
19th-century photographers
People from Golegã